The 1960–61 Ranji Trophy was the 27th season of the Ranji Trophy. Bombay won the title defeating Rajasthan in the final.

Group stage

West Zone

Central Zone

North Zone

South Zone

East Zone

Knockout stage

Final

Scorecards and averages 
 Cricketarchive

Notes

References

External links

1961 in Indian cricket
Ranji Trophy seasons